Mir Hazar Khan Khoso (30 September 1929 – 26 June 2021) was a Pakistani jurist who was the caretaker prime minister of Pakistan from 25 March to 5 June 2013. Khoso was a judge who previously served as the chief justice of the Federal Shariat Court and served as the interim prime minister ahead of the general elections scheduled in May 2013.

Personal life 
Khoso was born in Goth Azam Khan village in the Jaffarabad District of the South-East Balochistan Province of Pakistan, on 30 September 1929. During his youth, Khoso participated actively in the Pakistan Movement and noted Jinnah as his inspiration. He was of Baloch ethnicity. 

Khoso attended the Sindh University in 1950 and graduated with BA degree in 1954. After two years, Khoso secured a bachelor's degree in law from Karachi University. He was public prosecutor at Jacobabad, Sindh from 1966 to 1976. He was a professor in Government at Law College Quetta, Balochistan. He was also selected as a judge of the Supreme Court Pakistan from 1994 to 1996. He was also a member of Pakistan Public Service Commission from 1986 to 2001. He was chairman of the Sacked Employees Board for reinstatement. 

Khoso died on 26 June 2021 at the age of 91.

Judicial career 
Khoso began his professional career in 1957 as a lawyer of then West Pakistan Karachi Bench and then became a Supreme Court lawyer in 1980. He was chosen to become a judge at Balochistan High Court in 1977 and served in that position for the next two years. He was reappointed an additional judge in March 1985 and was confirmed as a permanent judge of the provincial high court in 1987. He was elevated as the chief justice of Balochistan High Court in 1989. He was appointed Governor of Balochistan twice but for brief periods. Firstly, he governed the province from 25 June until 12 July in 1990, and then from 13 March 1991 until 13 July in 1991.

After reaching superannuation and thus retirement from the judicial services, Khoso was appointed a judge of the Federal Shariat Court that rules according to Islamic injunction. After assuming his new responsibilities in 1991, the next year he was promoted as the chief justice of the Shariat Court and continued to be in this position till 1994. Khoso served as the Balochistan Chairman of the Zakat Council. For a long time, Khoso steered clear of politics, focusing mainly on his responsibilities at the Zakat Council. Due to his efforts, his home-district (Jaffarabad) has two Session Courts. Khoso fought for rights for females to become educated.

Prime Minister of Pakistan 
The Election Commission of Pakistan (ECP) appointed Khoso as the caretaker Prime Minister of Pakistan on 24 March 2013, out of four nominees coming from both the opposition and the dissolved government. He took oath on 25 March 2013.

Federal cabinet 
On 2 April 2013, the fourteen-member caretaker federal cabinet, as nominated by Khoso, took their oath administered by President Asif Ali Zardari at the Aiwan-e-Sadr in Islamabad. Among the ministers sworn in included Arif Nizami, Sohail Wajahat H Siddique, Shahzada Ahsan Ashraf Sheikh, Malik Habib, Ahmer Bilal Soofi, Dr Musaddiq Malik, Maqbool HH Rahmatoola, Abdul Malik Kasi, Asadullah Mandokhel, Mir Hassan Domki, Dr Sania Nishtar, Feroze Jamal Shah Kakakhel, Dr Younis Soomro and  Shahzada Jamal. The interim cabinet included seven members from the Punjab, three each from Sindh and Balochistan, and two from Khyber Pakhtunkhwa. The Khoso caretaker ministry served till the Third Sharif ministry took office after general elections in May 2013.

See also 

 Pakistan
 Election Commission of Pakistan

References

External links 
 

|-

|-

|-

1929 births
2021 deaths
Baloch politicians
Governors of Balochistan, Pakistan
Pakistan Movement activists
Chief Justices of the Balochistan High Court
Pakistani jurists
People from Jafarabad District
Prime Ministers of Pakistan
University of Karachi alumni
University of Sindh alumni
Caretaker prime ministers of Pakistan
Pakistan Movement activists from Balochistan